Frederick Daniel Cornwell (30 September 1875–5 December 1948) was a New Zealand painter and trade unionist. He was born in Hamilton, Lanarkshire, Scotland on 30 September 1875.

References

1875 births
1948 deaths
New Zealand trade unionists
Scottish emigrants to New Zealand
20th-century New Zealand painters
20th-century New Zealand male artists